First-seeded Althea Gibson defeated Darlene Hard 3–6, 6–1, 6–2 in the final to win the women's singles tennis title at the 1958 U.S. National Championships.

Seeds
The seeded players are listed below. Althea Gibson is the champion; others show in brackets the round in which they were eliminated.

  Althea Gibson (champion)
  Dorothy Knode (quarterfinals)
  Ann Haydon (third round)
  Maria Bueno (quarterfinals)
  Janet Hopps (first round)
  Sally Moore (quarterfinals)
  Christine Truman (quarterfinals)
  Beverly Baker Fleitz (semifinals)

Draw

Key
 Q = Qualifier
 WC = Wild card
 LL = Lucky loser
 r = Retired

Final eight

References

1958
1958 in women's tennis
1958 in American women's sports
Women's Singles